Salavdi Gugaev (Салавди Гугаев; 1917–2010) was a Chechen-American who worked for the rehabilitation of Chechens and Ingush who were exiled to Central Asia in an act of ethnic cleansing. Salavadi was initially a Soviet soldier who was captured by the Wehrmacht during the Continuation War, he had to spend a prolonged period of time in a POW camp.

Life as an activist 
After being released from the POW camp, Salavdi moved to the United States, where he began to periodically publish and appear on the air of the Voice of America and Radio Liberty stations, trying to draw the attention of the free world and heads of democratic states to the persecution for Stalin regime. The most significant contribution that Gugaev made to the rehabilitation of the peoples repressed in the USSR was his appeal to the United Nations on 1 July 1955, on the eve of the arrival of Nikita Khrushchev at the United Nations General Assembly. The document revealed the essence of the Stalinist actions (including the wholesale deportations of all ethnic Chechens and Ingush, Kalmyks, Balkars, and Karachays to Kazakhstan, Kyrgyzstan and Siberia), citing facts, figures, and eyewitness accounts; an employee of the UN apparatus helped to deliver the message to the addressee.

References 

1917 births
Chechen people
Chechen anti-communists
North Caucasian independence activists
American people of Chechen descent
Political activists
2010 deaths
Soviet emigrants to the United States
Soviet prisoners of war